is a railway station on the Etsumi-Nan Line in the city of Gujō, Gifu Prefecture, Japan, operated by the third-sector railway operator Nagaragawa Railway.

Lines

Station layout
Akaike Station has one ground-level side platform serving a single bi-directional track. The station is unattended.

Adjacent stations

History
Operations were transferred from Japanese National Railways (JNR) to the Nagaragawa Railway on December 11, 1986. The station was renamed Akaike Station on the same date.

Passenger statistics
In fiscal 2002, the station was used by an average of 38 passengers daily.

Surrounding area

See also
 List of railway stations in Japan
 Akaike Station (Aichi), a station in Aichi Prefecture with the same name

References

External links

 

Railway stations in Japan opened in 1952
Railway stations in Gifu Prefecture
Stations of Nagaragawa Railway
Gujō, Gifu